From the Gutter to the Stage is a compilation CD by the America heavy metal band Savatage, including songs from 1985 to 1995. A limited edition version including a bonus disc was also released.

Track listing

References

1996 compilation albums
Savatage albums
Albums produced by Paul O'Neill (rock producer)
Victor Entertainment compilation albums